The 30th Division (30. Division) was a unit of the Prussian/German Army. It was formed on April 1, 1887, as the 33rd Division and became the 30th Division on April 1, 1890, and was headquartered in Straßburg (now Strasbourg, France).  The division was subordinated in peacetime to the XV Army Corps (XV. Armeekorps). The division was disbanded in 1919 during the demobilization of the German Army after World War I.  The division was recruited primarily in the Rhineland and Westphalia, with the 105th Infantry Regiment recruited in the Kingdom of Saxony.

Combat chronicle

The division served in World War I on the Western Front. It saw action in the Battle of the Frontiers and in the Race for the Sea.  It fought in the two major battles of 1916, the Battle of Verdun and the Battle of the Somme.  In 1917, it fought in the Second Battle of the Aisne and the tank battle of Cambrai.  In 1918, it fought in the Battle of Champagne-Marne and the Second Battle of Cambrai.  Until the last campaigns of the war, the division was regarded as a first class division.

Pre–World War I organization

The organization of the 30th Division in 1914, shortly before the outbreak of World War I, was as follows:

60. Infanterie-Brigade 
2. Oberrheinisches Infanterie-Regiment Nr. 99 
4. Unter-Elsässisches Infanterie-Regiment Nr. 143
85. Infanterie-Brigade
Kgl. Sächs. 6. Infanterie-Regiment König Wilhelm II. von Württemberg Nr. 105
4. Lothringisches Infanterie-Regiment Nr. 136
30. Kavallerie-Brigade
3. Schleschisches Dragoner-Regiment Nr. 15
2. Rheinisches Husaren-Regiment Nr. 9
30. Feldartillerie-Brigade 
2. Ober-Elsässisches Feldartillerie-Regiment Nr. 51 
Straßburger Feldartillerie-Regiment Nr. 84

Order of battle on mobilization

On mobilization in August 1914 at the beginning of World War I, most divisional cavalry, including brigade headquarters, was withdrawn to form cavalry divisions or split up among divisions as reconnaissance units.  Divisions received engineer companies and other support units from their higher headquarters.  The 30th Division was redesignated the 30th Infantry Division. Its initial wartime organization was as follows:

60. Infanterie-Brigade 
2. Oberrheinisches Infanterie-Regiment Nr. 99 
4. Unter-Elsässisches Infanterie-Regiment Nr. 143
85. Infanterie-Brigade 
Kgl. Sächs. 6. Infanterie-Regiment König Wilhelm II. von Württemberg Nr. 105
4. Lothringisches Infanterie-Regiment Nr. 136
Jäger-Regiment zu Pferde Nr. 3
30. Feldartillerie-Brigade 
2. Ober-Elsässisches Feldartillerie-Regiment Nr. 51 
Straßburger Feldartillerie-Regiment Nr. 84
Reserve-Ulanen-Regiment Nr. 601 
1.Kompanie/1. Elsässisches Pionier-Bataillon Nr. 15

Late World War I organization

Divisions underwent many changes during the war, with regiments moving from division to division, and some being destroyed and rebuilt.  During the war, most divisions became triangular - one infantry brigade with three infantry regiments rather than two infantry brigades of two regiments (a "square division"). An artillery commander replaced the artillery brigade headquarters, the cavalry was further reduced, the engineer contingent was increased, and a divisional signals command was created. The 30th Infantry Division's order of battle on April 1, 1918, was as follows:

60. Infanterie-Brigade 
2. Oberrheinisches Infanterie-Regiment Nr. 99 
Kgl. Sächs. 6. Infanterie-Regiment König Wilhelm II. von Württemberg Nr. 105
4. Unter-Elsässisches Infanterie-Regiment Nr. 143
2.Eskadron/Husaren-Regiment Kaiser Nikolaus II von Rußland (1. Westfälisches) Nr. 8
Artillerie-Kommandeur 30
Reserve-Feldartillerie-Regiment Nr. 84 
Kgl. Bayerisches 10. Fußartillerie-Bataillon
Stab 1. Elsässisches Pionier-Bataillon Nr. 15
1.Kompanie/Elsässisches Pionier-Bataillon Nr. 15
5.Kompanie/Elsässisches Pionier-Bataillon Nr. 15
Minenwerfer-Kompanie Nr. 29
Divisions-Nachrichten-Kommandeur 30

References
 30. Infanterie-Division  (Chronik 1914/1918) - Der erste Weltkrieg
 Claus von Bredow, bearb., Historische Rang- und Stammliste des deutschen Heeres (1905)
 Hermann Cron et al., Ruhmeshalle unserer alten Armee (Berlin, 1935)
 Hermann Cron, Geschichte des deutschen Heeres im Weltkriege 1914-1918 (Berlin, 1937)
 Günter Wegner, Stellenbesetzung der deutschen Heere 1815-1939. (Biblio Verlag, Osnabrück, 1993), Bd. 1
 Histories of Two Hundred and Fifty-One Divisions of the German Army which Participated in the War (1914-1918), compiled from records of Intelligence section of the General Staff, American Expeditionary Forces, at General Headquarters, Chaumont, France 1919 (1920)

Notes

Infantry divisions of Germany in World War I
Military units and formations established in 1887
Military units and formations disestablished in 1919